David Ciente (born 9 July 1989) is a Romanian composer and producer. In 2012 and 2013, he attempted to represent Romania in the Eurovision Song Contest with his band Electric Fence, finishing in second place on both occasions. Having signed a record deal with native label Global Records since, he is best known for collaborating with artists such as Andra, Inna, Selena Gomez, Alicia Keys and Adam Lambert.

Early life
Born on 9 July 1989 in Oradea, Ciente discovered his musical passion and talent at a young age, taking classical piano lessons at the age of nine. He went on to study music and graduated from the National University of Music Bucharest. As a teenager, Ciente was the keyboard player in a local rock band, and later joined fellow local project Danger with which he had concerts in Romania and abroad. Upon leaving the group, Ciente created Raza—later known as Electric Fence—with Elena Vasile. They submitted the entries "Șun-ta" and "Emilia" for the 2012 and 2013 Selecția Națională, an event organized to select Romania's Eurovision Song Contest entries for the respective years, finishing second on both occasions.

In the subsequent years, Ciente signed a record deal with Romanian label Global Records and established himself as a producer, notably having worked with Romanian singer Inna on all tracks included on her sixth and seventh studio albums Yo (2019) and Heartbreaker (2020). He further collaborated with native artists Lariss, Shift and Andra, as well as with Alicia Keys and Adam Lambert. In 2020, Ciente composed the song "Ring" featured on Selena Gomez's Rare.

Production discography

References

External links
Discography on Discogs

Romanian composers
Romanian record producers
Living people
1989 births
People from Oradea